Skyview School may refer to:

 Skyview Elementary School, in the Bibb County School District, Macon, Georgia
 Skyview Elementary School, in the East Valley School District, Spokane, Washington
Skyview Upper Elementary School, Montgomery County, Pennsylvania
Skyview Junior High, Bothell, Washington
Skyview High School (Soldotna, Alaska)
Skyview High School (Tucson, Arizona)
Skyview High School (Thornton, Colorado)
Skyview High School (Nampa, Idaho)
Skyview High School (Billings, Montana)
Skyview High School (Vancouver, Washington)
Sky View High School, Smithfield, Utah